Taractrocera ardonia is a butterfly of the family Hesperiidae. It is found in Malaysia, Borneo (Kalimantan, Sarawak, Brunei, Sabah) and southern Sulawesi.

Subspecies
Taractrocera ardonia ardonia (Sulawesi and Salayar)
Taractrocera ardonia lamia Evans, 1926 (Malaysia Peninsula and Borneo).

External links
Phylogeny and biogeography of the genus Taractrocera Butler, 1870 (Lepidoptera: Hesperiidae), an example of Southeast Asian-Australian interchange

Taractrocerini
Butterflies of Singapore
Butterflies described in 1868
Butterflies of Asia
Taxa named by William Chapman Hewitson